The Pentecostal Assembly School is a co-educational Institution established on 4 April 1989. It is run by "The Christian Assembly of Bihar", an organization registered under the Societies Registration Act, 1860 (Act XXI of 1860).

History 

The school began with 30 students and two teaching staff in 1989 at 189, Co-operative Colony. Presently, it has classes from standard 1 to standard 12 with a population of 1700 students and a team of 80 staff.

The Pentecostal Assembly School is a co-educational Institution established on April 4th, 1989. It is run by "The Christian Assembly of Bihar" , an organization registered under the Society Registration Act XXI 1860.

See also
Education in India
Literacy in India
List of schools in India

References

External links
Official Site

Primary schools in India
High schools and secondary schools in Jharkhand
Christian schools in Jharkhand
Bokaro district
Educational institutions established in 1989
1989 establishments in Bihar